The 2019 Zhengzhou Open was a professional tennis tournament, played on outdoor hard courts. It was the sixth edition of the tournament and part of the Premier series on the 2019 WTA Tour, offering a total of $1,000,000 in prize money. It took place at the Zhongyuan Tennis Training Base Management Center in Zhengzhou, China, on 9–15 September 2019.

Points and prize money

Point distribution

Prize money 

1Qualifiers prize money is also the Round of 32 prize money.
*per team

Singles main draw entrants

Seeds 

 1 Rankings as of 26 August 2019.

Other entrants 
The following players received wildcards into the singles main draw:
  Angelique Kerber
  Duan Yingying 
  Yang Zhaoxuan

The following players received entry from the qualifying draw:
  Lu Jiajing
  Lesley Pattinama Kerkhove
  Wang Meiling
  You Xiaodi

Withdrawals
  Simona Halep → replaced by  Tereza Martincová
  Anett Kontaveit → replaced by  Jeļena Ostapenko
  Maria Sakkari → replaced by  Jasmine Paolini
  Lesia Tsurenko → replaced by  Fiona Ferro
  Wang Qiang → replaced by  Chloé Paquet

Doubles entrants

Seeds 

 1 Rankings as of 26 August 2019.

Other entrants
The following pair received a wildcard into the main draw:
  Guo Hanyu /  Yuan Yue

Champions

Singles

  Karolína Plíšková def.  Petra Martić, 6–3, 6–2

Doubles

  Nicole Melichar /  Květa Peschke def.  Yanina Wickmayer /  Tamara Zidanšek, 6–1, 7–6(7–2).

External links 
 Official website

References 

2019 WTA Tour
2019 in Chinese tennis
Zhengzhou Open
September 2019 sports events in China